Campus Area Bus Service (CABS) is a free public transportation system at the Ohio State University's Columbus campus. The system consists of five bus routes that connect various points of Ohio State's campus, and the immediate off-campus area. The system connects with the Central Ohio Transit Authority's bus routes at several points.

The system is one of the largest campus transit systems in the United States. Ridership has grown from 4 million passengers in 2003 to an estimated 5 million passengers in 2015.

History 
Bussing has been available at Ohio State since at least 1923. At the time, there was a single 1921 Reo bus that was made out of plywood and had solid rubber tires. When it was first offered, it was primarily used to transport students between the main campus, and the agricultural campus across the Olentangy River.

By the 1960s, there were 19 buses in the fleet, and buses ran as far north as Ohio State University Airport, and as far south as the Children's Hospital. There was both regularly scheduled service, and on-demand service available by calling the bus operator.

In the 1970s, there were a series of pushes by the student governments to provide bus service between the campus area, and off-campus area where most students lived due to safety concerns. In 1971, a group of students chartered a bus from the Columbus Transit Company to act as a shuttle between on-campus and off-campus arrest. Two routes served the area, one each for North and South campuses. When the service began, it cost $4 for a quarter-long pass, or 25¢ per ride. It was originally operated as a flag-stop service, meaning that students could board the bus from any intersection by signaling to the bus. This off-campus service was discontinued in January 1972 due to low ridership.

In 1978, a bus linking the on and off campus areas, this time operated by Ohio State, began due to an increasing rate of rape occurring near campus.

In 1991, Ohio State attempted to cut daytime bus service over its cost, but halted the move after receiving negative feedback. Student leaders requested time to notify would-be passengers, and daytime service was cut in January 1992.

In 1998, the university began to heavily invest in bus service, raising its budget from $1 million to $2.5 million. A traffic study that year determined that adequate parking could never be built. The university found that investing in transit is cheaper than building garages. It raised parking fees for the main campus and used the funds to purchase additional buses and expand service hours (from 29,000 to 83,000). Ridership subsequently increased from 1.2 million in 1998 to 2.3 million in 1999.

In 2009, CABS buses were equipped with GPS devices, giving passengers real-time arrival times for the bus system.

In 2012, the university gave parking operations to a private contractor. The move cut off the bus system's revenue stream, so the university moved to fund the service from its endowment.

On November 23, 2018, a bus carrying Ohio State University Wexner Medical Center employees was hit by a truck at an intersection resulting in at least 17 injuries. The truck driver was determined to be at fault. Following the incident, the university stated it would add more buses at peak times on the route to reduce overcrowding and that it was purchasing additional buses.

Services 
CABS routes can be planned through the Pivot app, a tool developed by Smart Columbus in 2020 for multi-modal trip planning and payment. An earlier service, called Connect and Ride or C-Ride, was developed with researchers at Battelle Memorial Institute in 2014.

Routes 

CABS currently operates five routes on Ohio State's main campus. Most routes run from early morning to night on weekdays, with some routes also offering late-night, 24-hour, and weekend service. Additionally, the university provides a pickup and dropoff service for disabled students.

Operation
The Campus Area Bus Service employs students for bus operation; approximately 67 percent of its drivers were students, provided with on-the-job training, in 2009.

Fleet
All of the buses in the CABS fleet are outfitted with automated passenger counters and GPS devices to gather data about ridership and bus performance as a part of Ohio State's Campus Transit Lab.

At least 33 of the 47 total buses in the fleet are powered by compressed natural gas (CNG) in an effort to reduce emissions, including six that were purchased with funds from the Volkswagen emissions scandal settlement. The transition from diesel to CNG began around 2015 due to the environmental and cost benefits, prompting a long-term plan to move the entire bus fleet to CNG. The move follows COTA, which began operating its first 30 CNG buses in 2013. CABS' fleet also includes several hybrid-electric vehicles.

Gallery

See also

 Public transit in Columbus, Ohio

References

External links 

 
 Route map

Ohio State University
Bus transportation in Ohio
University and college bus systems
Transportation in Columbus, Ohio
Zero-fare transport services
1923 establishments in Ohio